Green Africa Airways Ltd is a Nigerian airline, based in Lagos, Nigeria. The airline was founded in 2015 and commenced flights on 12 August 2021.

History 
Green Africa Airways was founded on 15 June 2015 by Babawande Afolabi, who serves as the chief executive officer. It was a new low-cost carrier targeting the Nigerian air travel market. Operations were originally planned to start in 2019, but have since been delayed. In mid-2018, the airline received the necessary operating licenses from the Nigerian Civil Aviation Authority. Green Africa's Board of directors consists of industry veterans including Tom Horton, former chairman and CEO of American Airlines; Virasb Vahidi, former CCO of American Airlines;  Wale Adeosun, founder and CEO of Kuramo Capital; and Gbenga Oyebode, founder and Chairman of Aluko & Oyebode.

In late 2018, Green Africa announced a letter of intent for 50 Boeing 737 MAX 8s, with an option for a further 50 aircraft. It was the largest order intention Boeing had ever received from an African airline. The order was valued $11.7 billion, according to list prices. However, this letter of intent was withdrawn in February 2020, and the airline instead opted to sign a memorandum of understanding for 50 Airbus A220-300s, which - if actually placed - would also be the largest order Airbus has ever received from an African carrier. Deliveries are scheduled to begin in 2021.

In order to bridge the gap between the first delivery, Green Africa has agreed to lease three A220-300s from GTLK Europe, so that operations would start in 2020, but these were also not delivered. In August 2020, Green Africa announced ex-Chief Financial Officer of SpiceJet - Kiran Koteshwar as the new Group Chief Financial officer starting from September 2020.

On 12 August 2021 the airline commenced operations with the first flight touching down at the Nnamdi Azikiwe International Airport in Abuja, Nigeria.

Legal issues 
In August 2021, Kenny Wole Awosika, his cofounder filed suit against Green Africa Airways and Babawande Afolabi for $30 million, alleging that they both founded the airline and was not provided with the agreed upon stake in the business. Mr. Awosika, had no choice to take on the civil action after 2 years of failed mediation and no progress with The Economic and Financial Crimes Commission (EFCC). The matter remains in court.

Destinations 
Green Africa Airways intends to initially serve the Nigerian domestic market with plans to further expand service across the African continent.

Fleet 
As of April 2021, the Green Africa Airways fleet was planned to consist of the following aircraft :

In April 2021, the airline took delivery of its first two ATR72-600 aircraft in order to commence certification flights with Nigeria Civil Aviation Authority.

See also 
 List of airlines in Nigeria
 Transport in Nigeria

References 

Airlines of Nigeria
Companies based in Lagos
Airlines established in 2015
Low-cost carriers
Transport in Lagos